Pyaar Koi Khel Nahin (English: Love is not a game) is a 1999 Indian Hindi language romantic film directed by Subhash Sehgal and produced by Sibte Hassan Rizvi. It stars Sunny Deol, Mahima Chaudhry and Apoorva Agnihotri. Music was composed by Jatin–Lalit and lyrics were written by Majrooh Sultanpuri.

Plot

Sunil (Apoorva Agnihotri) and Ashok are two friends. They are of marriageable age. One day Ashok's mom tells him to introduce himself to Shalu. But Ashok is reluctant to do so. He asks Sunil to impersonate him, and somehow reject Shalu. That way his mom will be satisfied and not pester him anymore. In the meantime, Shalu and Nisha (Mahima Chaudhry) have also decided like-wise, and planned to fool Sunil. But when the two couples meet, Sunil and Nisha fall in love, but are unable to tell each other about their impersonations. When they do so, they are already in love, and after meeting each other's parents, they get married. Enter Sunil's elder brother Anand (Sunny Deol), and complications abound. Anand is a successful businessman. Nisha works for Anand and he is in love with her and would like to marry her, but when he finds out that his brother loves her he steps down. Sunil and Nisha get married and have a kid but then Sunil is killed by Anands business partners who believe it to be Anand. Nisha's parents want her to get married again so Anand marries her as he still loves her. Anand then finds out that Sunil is alive and brings him back home even though Sunil had left because he knew that Anand loved Nisha. Anand sacrifices his life by intentionally getting himself killed by the bad guys before killing them, so that Nisha and Sunil could unite. Sunil and Nisha live happily ever after as wished by Anand.

Cast

 Sunny Deol as Anand 
 Mahima Chaudhry as Nisha Kapoor/Shalu
 Apoorva Agnihotri as Sunil / Ashok Khanna  
 Kulbhushan Kharbanda as Sunil and Anand's father
 Mohnish Behl as Kaanti
 Aasif Sheikh as Hemant; Kaanti's Younger Brother
 Dalip Tahil as Nath
 Bindu as Nath's Wife
 Nawab Shah (actor) as Baba, Nath's Son
 Reema Lagoo as Sunil and Anand's mother
 Neha Pendse as Guddi (Anand and Sunil's Sister)
 Dina Pathak as Anand and Sunil Grandmother
 Alok Nath as Kapoor, Nisha's Father
 Shama Deshpande as Nisha's Mother
 Ali Asgar (actor) as  Sunil's College friend
 Ravi Gossain as Ashok Khanna / Sunil, Sunil's College friend
 Rakesh Bedi as College Principal
 Navneet Nishan as Pratima, College Principal
 Shoma Anand as Vimla
 Veeru Krishnan as Hijra / Transgender
 Shahnawaz Pradhan as Jeevan 
 Dolly Bindra as Jeevan's Wife
 Narayani Shastri as Vimala's Daughter - Bride in marriage (Special Appearance) in the song '"Tere Galon Ki Chandni Dekhe"

Soundtrack

References

External links

1990s Hindi-language films
1999 films
Films scored by Jatin–Lalit
Indian romantic drama films
1999 romantic drama films